Gonzalo Bravo de Grajera (1604 – 30 August 1672) was a Roman Catholic prelate who served as Bishop of Coria (1671–1672) and Bishop of Palencia (1665–1671).

Biography
Gonzalo Bravo de Grajera was born in Arroyo de San Serván, Spain in 1604.
On 27 June 1665, he was appointed during the papacy of Pope Alexander VII as Bishop of Palencia.
In May 1666, he was consecrated bishop by Miguel Pérez Cevallos, Titular Bishop of Arcadiopolis in Asia.
On 28 September 1671, he was appointed during the papacy of Pope Clement X as Bishop of Coria.
He served as Bishop of Coria until his death on 30 August 1672.

References

External links and additional sources
 (for Chronology of Bishops) 
 (for Chronology of Bishops) 
 (for Chronology of Bishops) 
 (for Chronology of Bishops) 

17th-century Roman Catholic bishops in Spain
Bishops appointed by Pope Alexander VII
Bishops appointed by Pope Clement X
1604 births
1672 deaths